Prior authorization is a utilization management process used by some health insurance companies in the United States to determine if they will cover a prescribed procedure, service, or medication. The process is intended to act as a safety and cost-saving measure although it has received criticism from physicians for being costly and time-consuming.

Overview 
Prior authorization is a check run by some insurance companies or third-party payers in the United States before they will agree to cover certain prescribed medications or medical procedures. There are a number of reasons that insurance providers require prior authorization, including age, medical necessity, the availability of a generic alternative, or checking for drug interactions. A failed authorization can result in a requested service being denied or in an insurance company requiring the patient to go through a separate process known as "step therapy" or "fail first." Step therapy dictates that a patient must first see unsuccessful results from a medication or service preferred by the insurance provider, typically considered either more cost effective or safer, before the insurance company will cover a different service.

Process 
After a request comes in from a qualified provider, the request will go through the prior authorization process. The process to obtain prior authorization varies from insurer to insurer but typically involves the completion and faxing of a prior authorization form; according to a 2018 report, 88% are either partially or entirely manual.

At this point, the medical service may be approved or rejected, or additional information may be requested. If a service is rejected, the healthcare provider may file an appeal based on the provider's medical review process.  In some cases, an insurer may take up to 30 days to approve a request.

Purpose and costs 
Insurers have stated that the purpose of prior authorization checks is to provide cost savings to consumers by preventing unnecessary procedures as well as the prescribing of expensive brand name drugs when an appropriate generic is available. In addition, a prior authorization for a new prescription may help prevent potentially-dangerous drug interactions. A 2009 report from the Medical Board of Georgia showed that as many as 800 medical services require prior authorizations.

According to Medical Economics, physicians have expressed frustration with the current prior authorization process with regards to time spent interacting with insurance providers and the costs incurred based on that time. A 2009 study published in Health Affairs reported that primary care physicians spent 1.1 hours per week fulfilling prior authorizations, nursing staff spent 13.1 hours per week, and clerical staff spent 5.6 hours. A study in the Journal of the American Board of Family Medicine found that the annual cost per physician to conduct prior authorizations was between $2,161 and $3,430. The cost to health plans has been reported at between $10 and $25 per request. It is estimated that current prior authorization practices cost the US healthcare system between $23 and $31 billion annually.

Legislative and technological developments 
There have been a number of legislative and technological developments that attempt to make the prior authorization process more efficient.

In 2011, the American Medical Association made recommendations that a uniform prior authorization form should be adopted along with real-time electronic processing. The organization described a next generation prior authorization process which would involve a physician ordering a medical service, their staff completing a standardized request form, and an electronic submission process that would give same-day approval or denial of the request. The reasoning behind a denial would be clearly stated, allowing physicians to easily submit an appeal.

In February 2012, the Maryland Health Care Commission presented a plan to the state legislature, which outlined a standardized, electronic filing system for prior authorization requests. In response to a 2012 bill concerning the e-filing of prescriptions, the Kansas Board of Pharmacies advocated for an electronic prior authorization process, which would generate immediate approval for prescriptions. In 2013, the Arizona House of Representatives formed a committee to research the prior authorization process and make recommendations. Also, by 2013 a Washington State Senate proposal was submitted, which would require the state Insurance Commissioner to develop a standardized prior authorization form.

As of May 2013, the National Council for Prescription Drug Programs had adopted a standardized process for the exchange of electronic prior authorizations. The American Medical Association found that the average annual savings per physician from using an electronic prior authorization process to be approximately $1,742. Additionally, a case study conducted by Prime Therapeutics, a pharmacy benefit manager, demonstrated a 90% reduction in payer response time through electronic prior authorization systems compared with the manual prior authorization process.

In 2019, a consensus statement from several healthcare organizations supported standardizing the process.

References 

Health insurance in the United States
Healthcare in the United States
Managed care